Aripov (Russian: Арипов or Орипов, Uzbek: Oripov) is an Asian masculine surname, its feminine counterpart is Aripova. It may refer to
Abdulla Aripov (born 1961),  Prime Minister of Uzbekistan
Abdulla Oripov (poet) (1941–2016), Uzbek poet, literary translator, and politician 
Dilshod Aripov (born 1977), Uzbekistani wrestler
Farkhod Oripov (born 1984), Tajik swimmer